
Dual Shock Wave is an annual professional wrestling tag team tournament promoted by the Pro Wrestling Wave promotion. It has been held since 2011 and takes place between early September and mid-November. The first tournament, held in a single-elimination format, was used to determine the inaugural Wave Tag Team Champions. In 2012, the tournament was changed to a round-robin format with the winners of each block advancing to the finals. In 2014, the tournament returned to single-elimination format. Since October 2013, the name "Dual Shock Wave" has also referred to the Wave Tag Team Championship.

List of winners

2011 
The first ever Dual Shock Wave tournament was held in a single-elimination format between September 4 and October 30, 2011, and was used to determine the inaugural Wave Tag Team Champions. The pairings for each round were determined by a random draw. As the tournament featured an odd number of entrants, nine teams, one team earned a bye in the quarterfinals and one in the semifinals; these were also decided by a random draw.

Teams

2012 
The second Dual Shock Wave tournament was held between September 25 and November 16, 2012. The tournament was contested in a round-robin format with two blocks of four teams, where a win was worth two points, a draw one point and a loss zero points. As the reigning Wave Tag Team Champions, Gami and Tomoka Nakagawa earned an automatic spot in the tournament. As the reigning Dual Shock Wave winners, both Ayumi Kurihara, now teaming with Mika Iida, and Kana, now teaming with Ayako Hamada, also earned automatic spots in the tournament. Three of the teams, Hikaru Shida and Yumi Ohka, Misaki Ohata and Tsukasa Fujimoto, and Shuu Shibutani and Syuri, earned spots in the tournament by scoring eliminations in a five tag team elimination match on September 3, 2012, which also included the teams of Aya Yuki and Sawako Shimono, and Maki Narumiya and Yuu Yamagata. Narumiya and Yamagata were named the reserve team of Block A and Yuki and Shimono the reserve team of Block B, where they would enter the tournament in case of an injury, inheriting the points of the eliminated team. The final two teams of Apple Miyuki and Kyusei Ninja Ranmaru, and Makoto and Moeka Haruhi were so-called "producer recommendation" picks made by Gami. The winners of the tournament, if not Gami and Tomoka Nakagawa, would earn a shot at the Wave Tag Team Championship on November 27 at Korakuen Hall.

2013 
The 2013 Dual Shock Wave took place between September 1 and October 6. The winners of the tournament earned a shot at the Wave Tag Team Championship on October 30. Had the defending champions, Cherry and Shuu Shibutani, won the tournament, the title shot would have gone to the other finalist. The tournament was contested in a single round-robin block with eight participating teams. Hamuko Hoshi, Hikaru Shida and Tsukasa Fujimoto from Ice Ribbon entered the tournament as outsiders. In the tournament a win was worth one point, while both a draw and a loss were worth zero points. If a team drew or lost three times, they were eliminated from the tournament. The final match was a three-way match contested under "Dog Fight" rules, where only two teams were in the ring at the same time and after a pinfall or submission the losing team would switch places with the team not taking part in the match. The first team to pick up two consecutive pinfalls or submissions would be declared the winner.

October 6:
Three-way Dog Fight final match: Las Aventureras (Ayako Hamada and Yuu Yamagata) defeated Giann's (Kana and Yumi Ohka) and Muscle Venus (Hikaru Shida and Tsukasa Fujimoto).
Las Aventureras defeated Giann's (5:44).
Muscle Venus defeated Las Aventureras (7:57).
Giann's defeated Muscle Venus (9:40).
Las Aventureras defeated Giann's (18:22).
Las Aventureras defeated Muscle Venus (24:42).

2014 
The 2014 Dual Shock Wave took place between September 23 and October 15. For the first time in three years, the tournament was contested in a single-elimination format with eleven participating teams. The first five teams taking part in the tournament were determined in advance, while Kaho Kobayashi, Sawako Shimono, Sumire Natsu and Yumi Ohka earned spots in the tournament and the right to pick their partners after picking up eliminations in an eight-way elimination match on September 7. Finally, two teams featuring outsiders were also added; one with Fairy Nipponbashi teaming with Oz Academy's Dynamite Kansai and the other with Moeka Haruhi teaming with American freelancer Melanie Cruise. Prior to the start of the tournament, the reigning Wave Tag Team Champions Sakuragohan (Kyusei Sakura Hirota and Mika Iida) were booked to defend their title against Plus Minus 2014 (Mio Shirai and Misaki Ohata) with the winners advancing directly to the finals of the tournament, while the losers would start the tournament in the first round. On September 15, Sakuragohan successfully defended the title to advance to the finals of the tournament. The final match was also contested for the Wave Tag Team Championship.

Teams

First round
September 23:
Plus Minus 2014 defeated Chukan Kanrishoku (11:08)
Merazoma defeated Classic Gals (11:52)
Revolucion Amandla and Satsuma Kotsuji-gun wrestled to a draw (15:00)
Tomoka Nakagawa defeated Rina Yamashita in an overtime singles match (2:08)
Midori☆Game defeated Natsu Kensanba (11:58)
Fairy Family defeated Las Aventureras (11:11)
Second round
September 28:
Fairy Family defeated Midori☆Game (10:07)
Quarterfinals
October 1:
Plus Minus 2014 defeated Merazoma (11:13)
Revolucion Amandla defeated Fairy Family (8:59)
Semifinals
October 1:
Plus Minus 2014 and Revoluction Amandla wrestled to a draw (15:00)
Kyoko Kimura defeated Misaki Ohata in an overtime singles match (5:35)
Finals
October 15:
Revolucion Amandla defeated Sakuragohan (19:41)

2015 
The 2015 Dual Shock Wave took place between October 2 and October 30. For the second year in a row, the tournament took place in a single-elimination format with seven participating teams. The winning team would also win the vacant Wave Tag Team Championship. JWP Joshi Puroresu representative Kayoko Haruyama and freelancer Tsubasa Kuragaki entered the tournament as outsiders, after gaining the "producer recommendation" spot made by Gami.

Teams

2016 
The 2016 Dual Shock Wave took place between September 22 and October 10. In the tournament, each team was made up of a veteran and a younger wrestler. The matches all had a 20-minute time limit. In case of a draw, the younger wrestlers would face each other in a singles match to determine the winner.

Teams

2017 
The 2017 Dual Shock Wave took place on September 17. The tournament featured nine teams, seeded from number one to nine. The tournament would start with the number one seed taking on the number two seed with the winner advancing to face the number three seed and so on until all teams have wrestled at least once. Hiroe Nagahama and Kaho Kobayashi, the team seeded ninth, would defend the Wave Tag Team Championship in the final match of the tournament. Each match in the tournament would also feature special rules, determined by a random draw.

Results
1. Natsu & Natsuri (Natsumi Maki and Sumire Natsu)
2. Pyonzu, Zu (Kyusei Sakura Hirota and Saki)
Natsu & Natsuri defeated Pyonzu, Zu in a TLC match (2:07)
3. Kuso Onna Night (Nagisa Nozaki and Yuki Miyazaki)
Natsu & Natsuri and Kuso Onna Night wrestled to a time limit draw in a lumberjack match (5:00); both teams eliminated
4. Gokigen BBA (Cherry and Kaori Yoneyama)
5. So on Flower (Aoi Kizuki and Moeka Haruhi)
Gokigen BBA and So on Flower wrestled to a draw via double pinfall in a two-count match (4:22); both teams eliminated
6. Boss to Mammy (Mio Momono and Yumi Ohka)
7. Avid Rival (Misaki Ohata and Ryo Mizunami)
Boss to Mammy and Avid Rival wrestled to a time limit draw in a slow motion rules match (5:00)
Boss to Mammy defeated Avid Rival in a sudden death one-count match (1:10)
8. New-Tra (Rin Kadokura and Takumi Iroha)
New-Tra defeated Boss to Mammy in a submissions only match (5:50)
9. Big Rice Field (Hiroe Nagahama and Kaho Kobayashi)
New-Tra defeated Big Rice Field (18:08)

2020 
The 2020 edition of the tournament took place between November 1 and November 21, 2020. The signature match gimmick of the tournament were the three-way tag team matches instead of the classic two-on-two tag team matches.

Matches

See also 
Catch the Wave
Pro Wrestling Wave

References

External links 
The official Pro Wrestling Wave website

Pro Wrestling Wave
Women's professional wrestling tournaments
Tag team tournaments